The Pro-Wrestling: EVE International Championship is a women's professional wrestling championship created and promoted by the British professional wrestling promotion Pro-Wrestling: EVE. On 13 October 2018, Viper became the inaugural champion after defeating Jordynne Grace, Kasey and Laura Di Matteo in a  tournament final four-way elimination match to become the inaugural champion. Since then, there has been seven reigns shared among seven different wrestlers. The current champion is Yuu, who is in her first reign.

History 
On 13 October 2018, Viper became the inaugural champion after defeating Jordynne Grace, Kasey and Laura Di Matteo in a  tournament final four-way elimination match to become the inaugural champion.

Reigns

Combined reigns

References 

Women's professional wrestling championships